Cameron Lewis may refer to:

Cam Lewis (born 1997), American football cornerback
Cameron Lewis (General Hospital), a fictional character on American soap opera General Hospital
Cameron Lewis (musician), composer